Viktor Sinyak (Виктор Анатольевич Синяк, born ) is a Belarusian male former weightlifter, who competed in the bantamweight category and represented Belarus at international competitions. He won the silver medal at the 1991 European Weightlifting Championships. He participated at the 1996 Summer Olympics.

References

1970 births
Living people
Belarusian male weightlifters
Olympic weightlifters of Belarus
Weightlifters at the 1996 Summer Olympics